Channel drift or network decay is the gradual shift of a television network away from its original programming, to either target a newer and more profitable audience, or to broaden its viewership by including less niche programming. Often, this results in a shift from informative or artistic quality programming aimed at cultured and educated viewers toward sensational, ratings-based or reality-formatted programming designed solely for the entertainment of a mass audience. Channel drift frequently features the incorporation of infotainment, reality television and heavy advertising into the channel's lineup.

Overview

United States

Cable
Networks primarily focused on a particular topic, such as History Channel, tend to add shows that the channel's management feel that a larger audience wants to see, thus leading to additional profits. By producing irrelevant or low-quality programming they can increase their ratings to a target audience, increase viewership and increase revenues. The degree of channel drift can vary: some of the nonconforming programming may retain some degree of association with the channel's original purpose (such as in the case of the History Channel, Pawn Stars, American Pickers, and Top Shot), while other programming may have no association whatsoever (such as Ax Men and Ice Road Truckers).

Channel drift can also result from the acquisition of sports rights or reruns of popular television series that would otherwise not fit the channel's format; Outdoor Life Network, for instance, acquired the rights to the National Hockey League in 2005, so the network began transitioning toward a general sports network known today as NBCSN. Conversely, WGN America abandoned its expensive sports packages in 2014 as part of its drift from a Chicago-centric superstation into a nationally oriented general entertainment channel; WGN America eventually started a gradual transition away from entertainment programming, structured as such due to contractual commitments to existing syndicated programming, to adopt a cable news format as NewsNation in March 2021.

A channel may rebrand itself to more accurately reflect its new content. Sci-Fi Channel changed its name to Syfy for both trademark reasons and to allow a stretching of the network's definition of appropriate programming to include content such as Law & Order: Special Victims Unit reruns and WWE professional wrestling. (WWE moved to USA Network in 2016.) Another example is the conversion of Court TV to truTV, which allowed it to show more reality-based programming (though initially retaining a law enforcement focus, such as repeats of World's Wildest Police Videos) and slowly phase out their advertiser-repelling legal system and courtroom programming. This process ended in October 2009 when the remaining courtroom analysis programs transitioned to CNN.com's legal news section and occasional court coverage from CNN Center on the mainline channel. TruTV then aired competitions, hidden camera prank shows, and even the first three rounds of the NCAA Division I men's basketball tournament.  TruTV was further reformatted to a more conventional reality network with a strong emphasis on comedy on 27 October 2014, and then to comedy programming full-time in 2016 with the addition of scripted programming. Court TV would be revived as a digital subchannel network in 2019. Other examples include the drifting of The Learning Channel, which has officially renamed itself under the three-letter orphan initialism "TLC" since its transition to primarily reality television series, and that of most of the MTV Networks.

MTV Networks were a pioneer in channel drift. Music Television (as MTV was originally known) was originally a channel devoted to popular music videos upon its launch in August 1981, but began adding entertainment and reality programs geared toward a young adult audience in the 1990s, beginning a progression toward its current focus of reality and scripted programming. The music videos on the main channel were eventually limited to overnight and morning time periods, and were eventually pushed to spinoff networks MTV2, then to MTV Hits. MTV2 itself would gradually drift from an all-music video format to include reruns of MTV programs, original series, and acquired off-network sitcoms; MTV Hits would later be discontinued in favor of NickMusic.

Video Hits One likewise began as an outlet for adult contemporary music before transitioning to an urban pop culture channel as VH1; Country Music Television drifted to southern culture and general rerun programming as CMT; and The Nashville Network, perhaps the most dramatic, drifted to general entertainment format as The National Network and then to a heavily male-oriented program lineup known as Spike, only to drift back toward general entertainment in 2015 and become the Paramount Network in 2018, which is slated to become Paramount Movie Network in 2021.

While Nickelodeon has largely remained a children's-oriented channel throughout its history, its late-night Nick at Nite programming block (which for Nielsen ratings purposes is a separate channel from Nickelodeon) has drifted greatly from airing classic television (first from the Golden Age of Television, later expanding to shows from the 1960s and 1970s), to more recent shows still airing in local syndication, to its current focus on adolescent and young adult audiences similar to that of ABC Family (now Freeform). Nick at Nite launched TV Land as a spin-off channel due to its increased focus on more recent programming (as well as the elimination of non-sitcom programming on Nick at Nite), only for TV Land itself to eventually shift to more recent programming and even original programming. In recent years, networks such as Cozi TV and MeTV have emerged to fill this gap with their programming being primarily 1950s–1960s television shows; even those networks have left older content to early hours in their broadcast day for more recent content. Retro Television Network is the most prominent network still focused on 1950s and 1960s television shows.

Nickelodeon's cable channel Nicktoons is another example of channel drift, though in that channel's particular case, it has never had a particularly strong focus on anything other than being an overflow channel for Nickelodeon. In 2014, Nicktoons added sports content to its lineup to little viewer interest, but the block continues as three of the programs (NFL Rush Zone, WWE Slam City and Wild Grinders) were produced by sports leagues or to promote Viacom personalities on other networks (for Wild Grinders, MTV host Rob Dyrdek). Recently, Nicktoons' schedule has begun to feature live-action sitcoms on a cyclical basis, depending on the current output and success of Nickelodeon's animated series.

Channel drift can also result from a network's owner purchasing a competing channel and drifting one or both channels' formats to avoid overlapping. The aforementioned TNN was one example of this, as its Southern culture programming overlapped extensively with CMT's. ABC Family was also an example as The Walt Disney Company's 2001 purchase of the channel from News Corporation dramatically reduced its carriage of children's programming in order to avoid redundancy with Disney Channel. Destination America, a channel prone to frequent format changes over the course of its history, began as a network targeting rural middle America; parent company Discovery Communications' purchase of the former Scripps cable networks brought it under the same corporate umbrella as Great American Country, and thus Destination America began adding professional wrestling (briefly) and paranormal ghost-hunting programs to its schedule. Both GAC and Destination America were candidates to be reformatted entirely in 2019 to make way for the Magnolia Network, which is now expected to replace DIY Network when it launches in 2021.

Another case of channel drift is HLN, which started as CNN2. Its format originally consisted of rolling half-hour newscasts that were updated periodically throughout the day; one year after its launch, the channel changed its name to CNN Headline News to better reflect the rolling news format. By 2005, its programming began to include hour-long specialty and discussion-based news programs similar to those found on the main CNN channel (such as Showbiz Tonight, Nancy Grace and Issues with Jane Velez-Mitchell) and by 2013, it had ceased its scaled back rolling news coverage further – relegating it to morning and early afternoon timeslots – and shifted toward crime mysteries and docudramas, showing programs such as  Forensic Files.

Broadcast
One of the earliest examples of channel drift, and one that predates modern cable television, was programming changes by CBS. During the late 1960s, CBS had a reputation as a network with a disproportionate number of shows that targeted rural and older viewers, seen by advertisers as undesirable due to ingrained buying habits on the one hand and a greater perception of poverty on the other. Beginning in 1970, incoming network vice president Fred Silverman orchestrated the "rural purge," in which these shows would be canceled in favor of shows targeting younger, suburban viewers with more disposable income.

Another example of channel drift is the case of the Fox Broadcasting Company. Throughout its early existence, and even after its ascent to major network status, Fox had a reputation for lowbrow, alternative programming and knockoffs of other networks' hit shows, both aimed at a very young demographic. Beginning with the major success of American Idol in the early 2000s, Fox drifted away somewhat from this reputation; its dramas and sitcoms became more conventional, on the level of the historic Big Three television networks, and it put less emphasis on reality programs later that decade.

One less obvious, but nonetheless true, example of the phenomenon has occurred since the 1980s in American public television. From the origins of the medium in the late 1950s, stations, who were then affiliated with National Educational Television, the precursor to the current PBS, served two specific audiences: first, they provided, on weekdays, instructional programming for children used in school classrooms, to supplement traditional curricula; second, they served adults (on evenings and weekends) by scheduling shows that were alternatives to the fare available on commercial broadcasting, such as theatrical plays, classical music concerts, literary dramas, and serious public affairs initiatives like investigative reporting and civil discussion of political matters, things that had been mostly abandoned by the commercial networks with the end of the Golden Age of Television in and around 1960. Beginning with the Public Broadcasting Act of 1967, the Federal government, along with those of most U.S. states, invested in production and distribution of such programming via NET/PBS and the construction of a large number of new stations. The political climate of the time was decidedly liberal and thus supportive of generous governmental funding of the medium, which developed its institutions accordingly.

However, the 1970s saw a political turn rightward, increasingly suspicious of Federal programs especially, and originally-anticipated steady increases in public taxpayer support did not materialize, leaving the new PBS and its stations with significant monetary gaps that had to be filled by other sources. "Pledge drives," at least an annual occurrence on stations, emerged in the mid-1970s to address cutbacks from the Corporation for Public Broadcasting that occurred due to political changes and the economic recessions of that period; members of the general public would donate money to the station in exchange for certain privileges. Also, stations and program producers began to cultivate so-called "underwriting" (a modified form of advertising that did not interrupt shows in progress) from businesses, particularly large corporations who were then motivated by a sense of noblesse oblige to their communities and the country at large (in later years, these grants would become more targeted toward certain genres, raising suspicions by critics that they constituted de facto commercial advertising). This generated another large source of revenue. Some stations went so far as to stage week-long "auctions" of merchandise or services donated by retailers and other businesses, to which viewers would place "bids," from which the winner would receive the item or service in exchange for a donation to the station; these were quite successful in many markets from the 1970s through the 2000s.

In order to attract audiences who would donate to stations, which, in turn, purchased programming from other stations and producers in the PBS system, program managers felt increasingly that it was necessary to reduce the proportion of cultural and informational shows on the adult schedule, in order to appeal to a wider audience than a small, highly educated cohort. This especially became the case during pledge drives, which were imagined to be times when non-regular viewers could be appealed to with special programming. With the aging (and eventual death) of audiences who were the most enthusiastic for more serious (and heretofore customary) fare, it was felt that younger viewers with more disposable income would be more interested in programs akin to those they were accustomed to on commercial television rather than formats such as classical dramas (a number of them imports from the British Broadcasting Corporation) and documentaries on sometimes arcane subjects. This led to the introduction of things like lifestyle-oriented shows featuring hobbies like gardening, cooking, and home repair; specialty or niche informational programs like the Nightly Business Report and The Charlie Rose Show; reruns of certain former commercial TV shows (e.g., The Lawrence Welk Show, National Geographic specials); and British-import situation comedies (a la Are You Being Served?, Monty Python's Flying Circus). This amounted to exchanging what is termed as "high-brow" material for a more "middle-brow" approach to programming, while avoiding conspicuously mass-appeal formats such as adult-oriented game shows, action-oriented crime dramas, sensationalistic news magazines, and celebrity-driven talk shows. By the 1990s and 2000s, pledge drives became mainly reliant on fare such as TJ Lubinsky's nostalgic music specials (which themselves focus on oldies and adult standards music largely abandoned by commercial outlets) and self-help seminars of often questionable integrity (the latter were in fact not officially sanctioned by PBS and even rebuked by the network's ombudsman). Despite the stated aims to appeal to a non-elderly audience, PBS could not keep up, it seemed to many, with rapid developments in cable television, which began offering alternatives to viewers that were generally more sensationalistic and visually compelling than the staid, restrained traditions of the public medium. Some of those new networks in fact began aping the "how-to" and lifestyle formats that originally became popular via PBS (e.g., HGTV, Food Network). That competition, in turn, began to influence programmers to even further diminish or outright remove any shows considered "stuffy" or slow-paced, which eliminated several long-running staples of the network (e.g., Firing Line [original version], Wall Street Week).

At about the same time, development in technologies such as video cassette recorders enabled schoolteachers to bypass the need to schedule their classes around broadcasts of instructional material; typically, either school support staff would record the shows or teachers would do so themselves by using their VCRs' overnight silent-record function (some stations accommodated the latter practice by using what would otherwise be "dead air" time). Some PBS stations, in fact, took advantage of the changes to directly provide educational programs to schools without using airtime at all, something that accelerated with the emergence of video on demand via the internet in the 2000s. That created a void in the daytime hours that PBS executives decided to fill with a new generation of children's programming, aimed at preschoolers. To supplement beloved historic programs such as Sesame Street and Reading Rainbow, the network and leading stations developed several animated series with an educational and/or ethical emphasis. Part of that was also occasioned by the fact that commercial stations and networks were canceling children's cartoons, many of which were considered of dubious quality in any case, due to changing viewing habits and the FCC mandate, imposed in 1996, that required broadcast stations (of any kind) to include at least three hours per week of informational and educational programs for young people.

Therefore, with the original mission of public television having drastically changed in both its dimensions since its 1950s origins due to technological, political, and cultural shifts, channel drift became quite endemic to PBS and its affiliates. As such, this occurrence has left voids for adult viewers that have been filled mainly by two sources. First, the main fine arts source for television is the cable-and-satellite-distributed Classic Arts Showcase, which is funded entirely by an endowment from the estate of its founder and is not dependent whatsoever on private donations or government funding, unlike the PBS system. Second, serious, civil public affairs programming is frequently found on the C-SPAN networks, non-profit public services provided by cable companies and paid for by a portion of each customer's monthly bill. This supplements PBS news programming such as the PBS Newshour and Washington Week, two of the remaining public affairs programs on the national schedule.

Counterexamples
Channel drift is not always successful, and can often lead to backlash. The Weather Channel (TWC), for instance, faced criticism for its attempts to add entertainment programming to its schedule (which had historically focused primarily on weather news and information), culminating in the controversial introduction of a Friday-night movie block featuring films with some relation to weather as a plot point (such as The Perfect Storm). Citing the network's carriage fees and drift towards entertainment content, Dish Network dropped TWC and replaced it with WeatherNation's The Weather Cast on 21 May 2010, only to reach a deal to carry TWC again three days later.  In January 2014, TWC faced a similar carriage dispute with DirecTV, who dropped the channel by citing its carriage fees, and complaints from viewers over the amount of reality programming it had carried. DirecTV added a competing channel, WeatherNation TV, as an alternative. TWC reached a new carriage agreement with DirecTV on 8 April 2014, with the network agreeing to reduce the amount of reality programming it carries on weekdays.

The former Family Channel is one of the few known instances in which the amount of channel drift allowed was limited to some degree. Launching as religious network CBN Satellite Service (a cable extension of televangelist Pat Robertson's Christian Broadcasting Network) in 1977, it later incorporated family-oriented secular programs by 1984, which became the channel's dominant form of programming for nearly two decades. In 1990, CBN agreed to sell the network to International Family Entertainment, but with strings attached: it is required to air CBN's flagship program The 700 Club twice each weekday as well as a day-long CBN telethon each January in perpetuity as part of a long-term time-buy. Following its sale to News Corporation, CBN made another long-term time-buy on the station to air a daily half-hour CBN talk show, then known as Living the Life, to the lineup. After The Walt Disney Company acquired the channel from News Corporation in 2001, Disney planned to reformat the channel as "XYZ" (a reverse reference to the American Broadcasting Company's abbreviation) and shift its target to a more hip audience such as college students or young women; possibly to avoid redundancies with the existing family-friendly Disney Channel. To create XYZ, Fox Family would have had to cease to exist — Disney would have had to create XYZ as an entirely new network, and negotiate carriage agreements with pay television providers from scratch (something that, in modern times, is fairly common, but would have been much more disruptive to one of the most widely distributed channels on cable). Nonetheless, under the ABC Family brand, the channel drifted from its strictly family-friendly format under Disney ownership; the channel gradually dropped series aimed at children from its schedule and incorporated programs aimed at young adults featuring profanity, some violence, and some sexual content, alongside its family-oriented series and films, and now airs a standard disclaimer before each broadcast of The 700 Club in which The Walt Disney Company disowns any connection to the show. Disney further denied the "Family" stipulation existed in late 2015 when it announced plans to rename the channel "Freeform" in January 2016. In February 2009, Disney XD was originally launched as a boy-oriented TV channel, with the parent channel's shows aimed mostly at girls aged 13 – 16. Four years later, after the network was found to have a surprisingly high female audience, Disney XD added some programs with female protagonists, such as Kim Possible and Star vs. the Forces of Evil, while maintaining a mostly action-driven format.

In more recent years, networks have started abandoning the idea of channel drift as some of the channels experienced poor results. AMC (originally an outlet for "American Movie Classics") drifted successfully into premium scripted dramas in the late 2000s, such as Mad Men, The Walking Dead and Breaking Bad. However, a further drift into unscripted shows such as 4th and Loud (a docuseries focusing on an Arena Football League team owned by members of the rock band Kiss) and Game of Arms (a reality series following competitive arm wrestlers) were mostly unsuccessful, prompting the network to cancel all but two of the shows (Comic Book Men, a docuseries following a comic book store owned by filmmaker Kevin Smith, and the Walking Dead-related talk show Talking Dead) in favor of focusing more on its core scripted slate.

In the early-2010s, USA Network—which built a niche for lighthearted comedy-dramas through the 2000s—attempted to augment them with original sitcoms (such as Benched and Sirens) to build upon its acquisition of off-network reruns of Modern Family. USA mostly backed away from that approach by 2014, as it prepared a shift away from its previous "blue sky" direction for its drama slate.

Outside the United States

In some countries, cable television channels are subject to the rules and regulations set forth by each country's communications bureau and must be licensed accordingly.

Canada 
In Canada, specialty television channels were initially subject to conditions of license requiring them to operate within quotas of specific categories of programs. This system was designed primarily to ensure the integrity of channels that were licensed with the expectation of a specific format, and to prevent undue competition with established channels–a practice referred to as the "genre protection" rules.

For example, the presence of MuchMusic as an established music channel in Canada led to applications of these rules impacting the later launch of MTV-branded channels in Canada; Craig Media's MTV Canada was licensed as a channel featuring entertainment and informal education programming targeting youth and young adults, and could not devote more than 10% of its weekly programming to "music video clips" in order to protect MuchMusic. However, following complaints by its owner CHUM Limited (who also accused Craig of having used the pretense of a youth-based service to contravene the genre protection rule by, ultimately, offering a music-based service), the CRTC ruled that MTV Canada violated this quota due to music video content contained within programs such as Making the Video and MTV Select—even though the program categories distinguish music-related programs and music videos. Contrarily, sister channel MTV2 Canada was able to devote its lineup to music video programming, as it was licensed as part of "Music 5"—a specialty service consisting of channels devoted to specific genres of music.

A second incarnation of MTV Canada launched by CTVglobemedia in 2005 was also restricted in its airing of music content, but this time as the result of drift from its original format as TalkTV.

Outside of North America 
The South African Broadcasting Corporation originally had its 3 main channels dedicated to specific ethnic groups and their home languages. SABC 1 primarily broadcasts shows that target the Bantu-speakers, while SABC 2 focused on Afrikaans programming and SABC 3 aimed at the English-speaking South Africans. Anti-apartheid propaganda and prejudice against Afrikaners caused SABC2's Afrikaans programming to be gradually replaced with English despite its high viewership. The lack of Afrikaans programming, along with the launch of DStv's rival Afrikaans-channel KykNET, caused the once-popular SABC2's viewership to decline. The SABC has been met with strong criticism over its treatment of Afrikaans programming on SABC2.

In September 2020, GMA News TV began its gradual transition from its original news format to general entertainment and sports, since the acquisition of rights to NCAA and additional entertainment programs due to the increase of its commercial load. This changes was targeted by mounting viewers' criticism where entertainment programs should be pre-emptied for the news coverage, notably when the Philippines was hit by Typhoon Goni (Rolly) which later re-branded as GTV in February 2021.

Radio format drift
To a certain extent, channel drift can also occur in radio, especially music radio: see, for instance, the transition from oldies to classic hits, beautiful music to smooth jazz, and MOR to adult contemporary. In these cases, channel drift occurs when a format's older music becomes less popular or profitable (often due to the fans of that music dying, retiring, and leaving the area, or aging out of advertising demographics) and newer music is inserted into the playlist to draw younger listeners.

See also
 Key demographic

References

Further reading

External links
 Top 5 Networks That Have Sold Their Souls
 Demographic Downfall: Television Executives Missing the Point

Television terminology
Cable television
Change